Francesco Maria Schiaffino (1688 – 3 January 1763) was an Italian sculptor of the Rococo or late-Baroque, mainly active in his native city of Genoa.

Born into a family of sculptors, including his older brother Bernardo Schiaffino. In 1721–24, he apprenticed in the Roman studio of Camillo Rusconi. Returning to Genoa, he executed such works as St Dominic for the Teatro Carlo Felice, and Pluto and Proserpine sculpted for the Palazzo Reale. In 1738 he designed  the theatrical funeral monument to Caterina Fieschi Adorno for the church of Santissima Annunziata di Portoria, Genoa. In 1739, he also designed wax models of eight apostles and four doctors of the church (modelled after the apostle statues in the niches of San Giovanni in Laterano by Rusconi and others; these were used by Diego Francesco Carlone, to execute in stucco for the church of Santa Maria Assunta di Carignano. He had statues sent to the towns of Sestri, Camogli, and Albissola.

References

Index of works at Web Gallery of Art.
Francesco Maria Schiaffino biography at Web Gallery of Art.

1688 births
1763 deaths
17th-century Genoese people
18th-century Genoese people
18th-century Italian sculptors
Italian male sculptors
Italian Baroque sculptors
Rococo sculptors
Artists from Genoa
18th-century Italian male artists